Costasiella kuroshimae—also known as a "leaf slug", "leaf sheep",  or "salty ocean caterpillar"—is a species of sacoglossan sea slug. Costasiella kuroshimae are shell-less marine opisthobranch gastropod mollusks in the family Costasiellidae.

Description 
Discovered in 1993 off the coast of the Japanese island Kuroshima, Costasiella kuroshimae have been found in the waters near Japan, the Philippines, and Indonesia. They live in tropical climates. They have two dark eyes and two rhinophores that emerge from the tops of their heads that look not unlike sheep's ears or insect antennae, hence the common name "leaf sheep". The rhinophores have fine hairs that sense chemicals in the water, enabling Costasiella kuroshimae and other sea slugs to find food sources.

Costasiella kuroshimae are capable of a chemical process called kleptoplasty, in which they retain the chloroplasts from the algae they feed on. Absorbing the chloroplasts from algae then enables them to indirectly perform photosynthesis.

The type locality is Kuroshima, Taketomi, Okinawa, Ryukyu Islands.

References

External links 
 Gallery
 Sealife Collection Photos

Costasiellidae
Gastropods described in 1993